Samuel Woodworth (January 13, 1784  – December 9, 1842) was an American author, literary journalist, playwright, librettist, and poet.

Life
Woodworth was born in Scituate, Massachusetts, to Revolutionary War veteran Benjamin Woodworth and his wife Abigail Bryant. He was apprenticed to Benjamin Russell, editor of the Columbian Sentinel. He then moved to New Haven, Connecticut, where he briefly published the Belles-Lettres Repository, a weekly. He next moved to New York City, but recalled New Haven in his A Poem: New Haven.

Woodworth married Lydia Reeder in New York City on September 23, 1810. They had ten children between 1811 and 1829. Woodworth remained in New York for the rest of his life, dying there on December 9, 1842.

Woodworth's son, Selim E. Woodworth, was a U.S. Navy officer who took part in the rescue of the snowbound Donner Party in California. The USS Woodworth (DD-460) was named for him.

"The Old Oaken Bucket"

Woodworth is best known for the poem "The Old Oaken Bucket" (1817). The first stanza reads:

In 1826 the poem was set to music by George Kiallmark and by the early 20th Century it became one of America's most popular songs. It was recorded in 1899 by The Haydn Quartet, a famous barbershop quartet, and was released on Berliner Gramophone.

The Old Oaken Bucket House
The Old Oaken Bucket House in Scituate, Massachusetts is on the National Register of Historic Places. A sign on the house reads: "1630-1930 THE OLD OAKEN BUCKET Homestead and well made famous by Samuel Woodworth in his poem 'The Old Oaken Bucket.' Homestead erected by John Northey in 1675: Poet born in Scituate January 13, 1784. Massachusetts Bay Colony Tercentenary Commission."

The Old Oaken Bucket trophy
The Old Oaken Bucket trophy has been awarded every year since 1925 to the winner of the Big Ten Conference college football game between Purdue University and Indiana University. Although Woodworth was not from Indiana, the trophy's name refers to the sentiment that Hoosiers have for their home state.

Works by Samuel Woodworth

Published poetry
"The Hunters of Kentucky"
The Heroes of the lake : a poem, in two books 
Ode written for the celebration of the French Revolution, in the city of New York
An excursion of the dog-cart : a poem
Bubble & squeak, or, A dish of all sorts : being a collection of American poems
New-Haven : a poem, satirical and sentimental, with critical, humorous, descriptive, historical, biographical, and explanatory notes 
The poetical works of Samuel Woodworth 
Quarter-day, or, The horrors of the first of May : a poem 
Erie and Champlain, or, Champlain and Plattsburg : an ode
 "American Music: Remembering Samuel Woodworth" - excerpts of his verse and songs

Plays
La Fayette, or, The Castle of Olmutz 
King's Bridge Cottage : a revolutionary tale founded on an incident which occurred a few days previous to the evacuation of N. York by the British : a drama in two acts 
The widow's son, or, Which is the traitor : a melo-drama in three acts 
Bunker-Hill, or, The death of General Warren : an historic tragedy, in five acts
The Foundling of the Sea

Opera librettos
The deed of gift : a comic opera in three acts 
The forest rose, or, American farmers : a drama in two acts

Novel
The Champions of Freedom; or, The Mysterious Chief. A Romance of the Nineteenth Century, Founded on the War between the United States and Great Britain.

Hymn
Samuel was a founding member of the New York Society of the New Church (Swedenborgian) and one of his poems became a hymn - "Oh for a seraph's golden lyre" - which is still sung by some New Church congregations.

References

External links

 Scituate Historical Society
 A family tree of Samuel Woodworth
 The Old Oaken Bucket
 Article about his grave being moved in 1937 including his Bibliography
 Recording of the song The Old Oaken Bucket
 Parody of the song by Nat M. Wills
  Singer songwriter Greg Cherone's 2008 contemporary version of "Old Oaken Bucket."
 "Introduction to THE POETICAL WORKS OF SAMUEL WOODWORTH"
 
 

1785 births
1842 deaths
People from Scituate, Massachusetts
American Swedenborgians
19th-century American poets
American male poets
Writers from New Haven, Connecticut
Samuel
19th-century American dramatists and playwrights